Nuh Assembly constituency is one of the 90 constituencies in the Haryana Legislative Assembly of Haryana a north state of India. Nuh is also part of Gurgaon Lok Sabha constituency.

Members of Legislative Assembly

Election results

General elections 2019

General elections 2014

See also

 Nuh
 Nuh district
 List of constituencies of Haryana Legislative Assembly

References

Assembly constituencies of Haryana
Nuh district